New Mr. Vampire (Chinese title: 殭屍翻生; lit. "The Vampire Revived") a.k.a. The New Mr. Vampire is a 1987 Hong Kong horror film directed by Billy Chan and Leung Chung. It stars Chin Siu-ho (as Hsiao Hau Chien) and Lu Fang (as Tai-Fa) as the disciples and Chung Fat and Huang Ha as the rival masters Chin and Wu.

Synopsis
The brother of a local business baron is killed by a hopping corpse, a creature from Chinese jiangshi fiction. Chin and his disciple set to bury the corpse but their plans are foiled by Wu who allows the corpse to turn into a vampire. Meanwhile, Hsiao in a grave robbery attempt accidentally awakens a female corpse (Wong Siu Fung) who eventually turns out to be the Marshal's (Shum Wai) wife. During the commotion, Wu steals the vampire and sets it loose but is restrained by Chin who transports and hides the vampire in a hotel run by Wu Ma. The Marshal discovers them and his reanimated wife but the vampire is let loose once more by Wu and they all team up with the Marshal and his army to stop it.

Cast
 Chin Siu-ho
 Chung Fat
 Lui Fong
 Huang Ha
 Shum Wai
 Po Tai
 Ku Feng
 Wu Ma
 Sam Wong
 Chan Man-Ching
 Fung Ging-Man
 King Lee
 Baan Yun-Sang
 Wu Jiang
 Wong Yat-Lung

Box office
New Mr. Vampire ran from 8 to 25 May 1986 and grossed HK$13,073,563.00 at the box office.

References

External links
 
 
 New Mr. Vampire at Hong Kong Cinemagic
 New Mr. Vampire at Love Hong Kong Film

1987 horror films
1987 films
Hong Kong horror films
Mr. Vampire
Jiangshi films
Martial arts horror films
1980s Hong Kong films